Jan Vondráček (born 16 August 1966 in Prague) is a Czech actor and dubber. He starred in the film Operace Silver A under director Jiří Strach in 2007. From 9 January 2023, he is the voice announcer for Trams in Prague, as part of the Prague Integrated Transport system.

References

External links

1966 births
Living people
Czech male film actors
Czech male television actors
Czech male stage actors
Czech male voice actors
Male actors from Prague
Academy of Performing Arts in Prague alumni